The Ennio Quirino Visconti Liceo Ginnasio ("Ennio Quirino Visconti Lyceum–Gymnasium") is the oldest and most prestigious  in Rome, also known as Roman College due to its previous historical role.

History
The  was set up shortly after the Capture of Rome in 1871 in the building that had housed the Jesuit Roman College. It was dedicated to the famous Roman archaeologist Ennio Quirino Visconti, who had supported the Francophile Roman Republic at the end of the 18th century.

Notes

See also
 Liceo classico
 List of Jesuit sites

External links 
 Official site of the Liceo "Visconti"

Schools in Rome
Secondary schools in Italy